The Giving Card  is a point of sale discount card company based in Elstree that is linked to charitable giving. Members pay an annual subscription fee of £34.95 of which a charity of their choice receives £10.00. In return the customer is rewarded with discounts both locally and nationally across the UK. The Giving Card offers discounts in six different categories: Food and Drink, Health and Beauty, Travel and Leisure, Entertainment, Services and Retail.

The Giving Card was founded in November 2010 and launched in November 2011 by Dan Taylor; a young entrepreneur. The business was set up to increase footfall into suppliers’ stores in a new and innovative way as well as helping charities gain much needed revenue; whilst simultaneously helping the consumer save money.

The Giving Card works with over 3000 suppliers and 80 charities including Mencap and Shelter; involving no fee for participation from suppliers or charities. Discounts offered range from 50% off of haircuts to 15% off of kids acting classes, and the suppliers range from well-known high street brands such as Halfords to other less known brands.

Discounted membership price offers are sometimes available and offered on The Giving Card's Facebook and Twitter pages.

Awards

The giving card has also been named one of the top 100 start-up businesses in 2012, reaching number 17. As well as winning the Future 100 Award December 2011  and The Shell Live Wire Grand Ideas Awards 2011.

References

Companies based in Hertsmere
2010 establishments in the United Kingdom